Ashi Singh is an Indian television actress. She portrayed the role of Naina Agarwal in Sony Entertainment Television's Yeh Un Dinon Ki Baat Hai. In 2020, she appeared as Princess Yasmine in Sony SAB's Aladdin – Naam Toh Suna Hoga. Since 2021, she is appearing as Meet Hooda in Zee TV's Meet.

Career 
Ashi Singh made her television debut through the show Secret Diaries: The Hidden Chapters in 2015. She was also seen in Gumrah, Crime Patrol and Savdhaan India. She made a cameo appearance in Qaidi Band as the jailer's daughter.

In 2017, she was selected to play the lead role of Naina Agarwal in SET India's Yeh Un Dinon Ki Baat Hai opposite Randeep Rai. The show ran successfully until August 2019.

In July 2020, after Avneet Kaur quit the show on health basis, Ashi then played Yasmine on Sony SAB's Aladdin – Naam Toh Suna Hoga opposite Siddharth Nigam.

Since 2021, she is appearing as Meet Hooda in Zee TV's Meet: Badlegi Duniya Ki Reet opposite Shagun Pandey.

Media 

In 2019, she featured on the cover of Eastern Eye in its 1500th issue, under the title of "The Future Belongs to Ashi Singh".

Filmography

Television

Special appearances

Films

Music videos

Award and nominations

References

External links

People from Agra
Actresses from Mumbai
Living people
Year of birth missing (living people)